Malcolm Bailey (7 May 1937 – 2016) was an English professional footballer who played as a wing half for Bradford Park Avenue and Accrington Stanley in the Football League. He was born in Halifax.

References

1937 births
2016 deaths
Accrington Stanley F.C. (1891) players
Association football wing halves
Barnsley F.C. players
Bradford (Park Avenue) A.F.C. players
English Football League players
English footballers
Footballers from Halifax, West Yorkshire